Gia Bình may refer to several places in Vietnam:

Gia Bình District, a rural district of Bắc Ninh Province
Gia Bình, Bắc Ninh, a township and capital of Gia Bình District
, a ward of Trảng Bàng town